Commodores Live! is a live album  by the Commodores, released in 1977. The album reached number 3 on the Billboard 200 chart.

The album was recorded during their 1976-1977 coast-to-coast US tour, primarily during their Atlanta and Washington D.C. shows. The last track, "Too Hot ta Trot", is a studio recording.

Track listing
Motown – M7-902R1

Charts

References

External links 
 Commodores Live! at Discogs

Commodores albums
1977 live albums
albums produced by James Anthony Carmichael
Motown live albums